Triple point may refer to:
 Triple point, the temperature and pressure at which an element or compound exists in equilibrium between the solid, liquid, and gaseous phases of matter
 Tri-point or tripoint, the place where three boundaries or territories meet
 Occluded front, the location where a warm front and an occluded front meet during cyclogenesis